Lombardia may refer to:

 Lombardia, Italian name for Lombardy region in Italy
 Lombardia Svizzera, alternative name of Italian Switzerland
 Lombardia Siciliana, ethno-linguistic minority living in Sicily, southern Italy
 Lombardia (wine), wine produced in the Lombardy region of north central Italy
 Ascelin of Lombardia, a 13th-century Dominican friar
 Romano di Lombardia, a municipality in the Province of Bergamo in the Italian region of Lombardy
 Palazzo Lombardia, a skyscraper in Milan, Italy
 Giro di Lombardia, a cycling race, in Lombardy, Italy
 Castello di Lombardia, castle in Enna, Sicily

People with the surname
 Pedro Lombardía, Spanish canonist

See also
 Lombardi (disambiguation)
 Lombardo